Lloyd Spotted Wolf is a former American football player and coach.  He served as the head football coach at Bacone College from 2009 to 2010, compiling a record of 4–16. He currently teaches English and coaches wide receivers and H-backs at Bridgeland High School in Cypress, Texas.

Playing career
Spotted Wolf played offensive line for the Adams State College Grizzlies.  He was a four-year letterman and three-year starter, and was an Academic All-Conference selection in the Rocky Mountain Athletic Conference.

Coaching career

Assistant coaching
Spotted Wolf has coached at the NCAA Division I, II and III, junior college and high school levels.  He is currently the Run Game Coordinator and Offensive Line Coach at Rio Rancho High School in Rio Rancho, New Mexico, where in his two seasons he has helped lead the Rams to a District 1AAAAA Championship and two playoff appearances. He has been on the coaching staff at Blinn College, Oklahoma Panhandle State University, La Cueva High School in Albuquerque, New Mexico, University of Wisconsin-Eau Claire and the University of New Mexico.

Bacone
In 2009, Spotted Wolf was named the third head football coach for the Bacone Warriors in Muskogee, Oklahoma.  His coaching record at Bacone was 4–16.

Heritage
Spotted Wolf is a member of the Native American Hidatsa Tribe.  He also has ancestry of Seminole and Creek nations.

References

External links
 West Texas A&M profile

Year of birth missing (living people)
Living people
American football offensive linemen
Adams State Grizzlies football players
Bacone Warriors football coaches
Blinn Buccaneers football coaches
Oklahoma Panhandle State Aggies football coaches
West Texas A&M Buffaloes football coaches
High school football coaches in New Mexico
High school football coaches in Texas
University of New Mexico alumni